Alba was a Portuguese automobile manufactured from 1952 until 1961.

See also
 Alba (1907 automobile)
 Alba (1913 automobile)

References

Cars of Portugal
Cars introduced in 1952

1960s cars